Alteva (NYSE MKT: ALTV) is a communications provider headquartered in Philadelphia. The company evolved from its roots as a local telephone switchboard operator into a cloud communications company.

Alteva has two divisions  - Alteva, the Unified Communications provider and Alteva Residential, an Incumbent Local Exchange Carrier (ILEC) providing communications services in the Hudson Valley area of New York and Northern New Jersey as well as a Competitive Local Exchange Carrier (CLEC) providing national communication services.

References

Telecommunications companies of the United States